WCLD is a Gospel formatted broadcast radio station.  The station is licensed to Cleveland, Mississippi and serves Cleveland, Clarksdale, Greenville, Greenwood, and Indianola in Mississippi.  WCLD is owned by Radio Cleveland, Inc.

References

External links
 AM1490 Rejoice! on Facebook
 
 

1949 establishments in Mississippi
Gospel radio stations in the United States
Radio stations established in 1949
CLD